Sympathy for the Devil is an upcoming American psychological horror film written by Luke Paradise, directed by Yuval Adler and starring Joel Kinnaman and Nicolas Cage.

The film is scheduled to be theatrically released on July 28, 2023, by RLJE Films.

Cast
 Joel Kinnaman as The Driver
 Nicolas Cage as The Passenger
 Kaiwi Lyman 
 Cameron Lee Price 
 Burns Burns 
 Rich Hopkins  
 Nancy Good 
 Alexis Zollicoffer 
 Oliver McCallum 
 Annisse White 
 Danny Tesla

Production
Filming began in Las Vegas in July 2022.  Approximately half the film was shot at a Las Vegas-based virtual studio owned by Vū Technologies.  Sympathy for the Devil was the first feature film in Nevada history to be shot on an LED sound stage.

Release
In September 2022, the film was presented to buyers at TIFF.  In March 2023, RLJE Films acquired the North America, United Kingdom, Ireland, Australia and New Zealand distribution rights.  It is scheduled to be released on July 28, 2023.

References

External links
 

Upcoming films
2023 thriller films
Thriller films
2020s English-language films
2020s American films
Films shot in the Las Vegas Valley
RLJE Films